Oliver Marach and Aisam-ul-Haq Qureshi were the defending champions but decided not to participate.
Wildcards Lu Yen-hsun and Danai Udomchoke won the tournament, defeating Eric Butorac and Paul Hanley in the final, 6–3, 6–4.

Seeds

Draw

Draw

References
 Main Draw

Doubles
PTT Thailand Open - Doubles
 in Thai tennis